Aspergillus lentulus is a species of Aspergillus fungus. It is a close relative of Aspergillus fumigatus. It also has decreased in vitro susceptibilities to multiple antifungals, including amphotericin B, itraconazole, voriconazole, and caspofungin. Aspergillus lentulus is an opportunistic human pathogen that causes invasive aspergillosis with high mortality rates. It has been isolated from clinical and environmental sources. Since it was described in 2005 as a new species, it was thought to reproduce only asexually. However, in 2013 Swilaiman et al. (2013) found that A. lentulus has a functional sexual cycle. During this cycle cleistothecia are produced that, when mature, contain heat-resistant ascospores.

Growth and morphology

A. lentulus has been cultivated on both Czapek yeast extract agar (CYA) plates and Malt Extract Agar Oxoid® (MEAOX) plates. The growth morphology of the colonies can be seen in the pictures below.

References

lentulus
Aquatic fungi
Fungi described in 2005